Cherkassy is the name of several rural localities in Russia:
Cherkassy, Davlekanovsky District, Republic of Bashkortostan, a village in Sokolovsky Selsoviet of Davlekanovsky District in the Republic of Bashkortostan
Cherkassy, Sterlitamaksky District, Republic of Bashkortostan, a village in Krasnoyarsky Selsoviet of Sterlitamaksky District in the Republic of Bashkortostan
Cherkassy, Ufimsky District, Republic of Bashkortostan, a selo in Cherkassky Selsoviet of Ufimsky District in the Republic of Bashkortostan
Cherkassy, Kursk Oblast, a khutor in Artyukhovsky Selsoviet of Oktyabrsky District in Kursk Oblast
Cherkassy, Lipetsk Oblast, a selo in Cherkassky Selsoviet of Yeletsky District in Lipetsk Oblast; 
Cherkassy, Orenburg Oblast, a selo in Cherkassky Selsoviet of Saraktashsky District in Orenburg Oblast
Cherkassy, Penza Oblast, a selo in Potlovsky Selsoviet of Kolyshleysky District in Penza Oblast
Cherkassy, Tula Oblast, a selo in Yablonevsky Rural Okrug of Kamensky District in Tula Oblast